WOGH (103.5 MHz) is a commercial FM radio station licensed to Burgettstown, Pennsylvania, United States. It serves Western Pennsylvania including part of Greater Pittsburgh, as well as the West Virginia Panhandle and Eastern Ohio. It is owned by Forever Media and airs a country radio format known as "Froggy".

WOGH has an effective radiated power (ERP) of 19,500 watts. The transmitter is on Burr Avenue in Mingo Junction, Ohio, near the Ohio River. It shares a tower with WTOV-TV.

History
On May 1, 1947, the station signed on as WSTV-FM. It was originally licensed to Steubenville, Ohio, co-owned with WSTV (1340 AM). The two stations mostly simulcast, although WSTV went dark in 2011.

In the early 2000s, WOGH was part of a multi-station simulcast known as "Froggy." Sister stations include the "Froggyland" flagship WOGI "Froggy 104.3", WOGG "Froggy 94.9" and WFGI "Froggy 95.5". FM 103.5 had Froggy-oriented call signs, WOGE in 2000 and WOGH from 2000 to 2017.

Willie 103.5

On April 11, 2017, WOGH split from the "Froggy" simulcast and flipped to classic country, branded as "Willie 103.5." On April 17, 2017, WOGH changed its call letters to WLYI, to go with the "Willie 103.5" branding.

Froggy returns
On August 1, 2022, WLYI flipped back to country, once again as part of "Froggy". The station changed its call letters back to WOGH with the change.

WLYI had an application with the Federal Communications Commission (FCC) to move its tower location from Jefferson County, Ohio, to an area near Imperial, Pennsylvania, thus giving it complete coverage within the Pittsburgh metropolitan area. However that application was dismissed by the FCC for failing to provide FAA registration data for the application. The station is currently owned by Forever Media, LLC.

References

External links

OGH
Country radio stations in the United States
Radio stations established in 1947
1947 establishments in Pennsylvania